Thornburg may refer to:


Places in the United States
 Thornburg, Iowa, a city
 Thornburg, Kansas, an unincorporated community
 Thornburg, Pennsylvania, a borough
 Thornburg, Virginia, an unincorporated community

People
 Alan Z. Thornburg (born 1967), American lawyer and jurist
 Elizabeth June Thornburg, birth name of Betty Hutton (1921–2007), American actress, comedian, dancer and singer
 Jeremy Thornburg (born 1982), American football player
 Lacy Thornburg (born 1929), American lawyer and retired judge
 Lee Thornburg, trumpeter
 Marion Thornburg, birth name of Marion Hutton (1919–1987), American singer and actress, sister of Betty Hutton
 Newton Thornburg (1929-2011), American novelist and screenwriter
 Tyler Thornburg (born 1988), American Major League Baseball pitcher

Other uses
 Thornburg Mortgage, a defunct American real estate investment trust
 Thornburg Placer Mine - see List of mines in Oregon

See also
 Thornburg House, Barboursville, West Virginia, United States, on the National Register of Historic Places
 Thornburg v. Gingles, a 1986 United States Supreme Court case
 Thornburgh